

This is a list of the National Register of Historic Places listings in Charleston County, South Carolina.

This is intended to be a complete list of the properties and districts on the National Register of Historic Places in Charleston County, South Carolina, United States.  The locations of National Register properties and districts for which the latitude and longitude coordinates are included below, may be seen in an online map.

There are 204 properties and districts listed on the National Register in the county, including 43 National Historic Landmarks.  The city of Charleston is the location of 104 of these properties and districts, including 34 of the National Historic Landmarks; they are listed separately, while 103 properties and districts in the remaining parts of the county, including 9 National Historic Landmarks, are listed here. Another 5 properties in Charleston County outside Charleston were once listed but have been removed. Three properties and districts — the Ashley River Historic District, Ashley River Road, and the Secessionville Historic District — are split between the city and the other parts of the county, and are thus included on both lists.

Current listings

|}

Former listings

|}

See also

List of National Historic Landmarks in South Carolina
National Register of Historic Places listings in South Carolina

References

 
Charleston